Baron Friedrich von Stuart (1761-1842) was a Courland nobleman and landowner.
He was married to Henrietta Kant, a niece of Immanuel Kant.

They are ancestors of Count Eric Stenbock, the ambassador Henning von Wistinghausen, Baron Dmitri Stuart, an ambassador of Russia to Romania and Denmark and Renārs Kaupers.

References 

 Aus meiner näheren Umwelt Eine estländische Kindheit vor 100 Jahren. Wistinghausen, Walter von. Tallinn, Avita 1995.

1761 births
1842 deaths
Friedrich
Russian nobility